Robyville is an unincorporated community in Smithfield Township, Jefferson County, Ohio, United States.

Robyville was a company town for the Roby Coal Company, which operated multiple large mines nearby. The Robyville Post Office was established on August 15, 1902 and discontinued on August 31, 1928. Mail service is now handled through the Adena branch.

References

Unincorporated communities in Jefferson County, Ohio